This is a list of candidates for the 1877 New South Wales colonial election. The election was held from 24 October to 12 November 1877.

There was no recognisable party structure at this election.

Retiring Members
Edward Butler MLA (Argyle)
Charles Byrnes MLA (Parramatta)
William Hay MLA (Murray)
George Lord MLA (Bogan) — appointed to the Legislative Council
Joseph Phelps MLA (Balranald)
Patrick Shepherd MLA (Nepean)
James Warden MLA (Shoalhaven)
John Wright MLA (Queanbeyan)

Legislative Assembly
Sitting members are shown in bold text. Successful candidates are highlighted.

Electorates are arranged chronologically from the day the poll was held. Because of the sequence of polling, some sitting members who were defeated in their constituencies were then able to contest other constituencies later in the polling period. On the second occasion, these members are shown in italic text.

See also
 Members of the New South Wales Legislative Assembly, 1877–1880

References
 

1877